Barellan  is a small town in Narrandera Shire in the Riverina region of New South Wales, Australia.  On Census night 2021, Barellan had a population of 276. It is a quiet Riverina wheat town on the Burley Griffin Way, with characteristic silos, and functions primarily as a service centre for the surrounding agricultural area.

History

The name of Barellan is an Aboriginal expression that literally means the meeting of the waters.

The railway reached Barellan in 1908 and a post office was opened on 1 April 1909.

The Commercial Hotel, "a typically large and rather gracious hotel with an impressive upper verandah", was built in 1924.

Barellan was also the first town to have a Country Women's Association (CWA) rest house, built in 1924, the same year as the hotel.

In 2009, Barellan celebrated its centenary.

Demography
Until recently, the population numbers have remained relatively constant, evidenced as follows:

Heritage listings 
Barellan has a number of heritage-listed sites, including:
 Yapunyah Street: CWA Rest House

Evonne Goolagong
Barellan is notable as the childhood home of the tennis player Evonne Goolagong (now Evonne Goolagong Cawley). There is a small plaque honouring her in the main street. Evonne Goolagong was born in nearby Griffith on 31 July 1951 and attended Barellan Primary School. Although Aboriginal people faced widespread discrimination in rural Australia at this time, Evonne was able to play tennis in Barellan from childhood thanks to Bill Kurtzman, a kindly resident, who saw her peering through the fence at the local courts and encouraged her to come in to play. Goolagong left Barellan to attend Willoughby Girls High School in Sydney where she developed her tennis-playing skills.

The Big Tennis Racquet

Goolagong unveiled the exact scale model of the wooden Dunlop racquet during Barellan's centenary celebrations on 3 October 2009.

Barellan Central School
Barellan has a central school that goes from kindergarten to year 12 and has 100 enrolled students. Barellan is part of the RAP (Riverina Access Partnership) which allows the year 11 and 12 students to complete their HSC. It comprises students from Hillston Central, Ardlethan Central and Ariah Park Central in video conferencing. In 2010, Oaklands Central and Urana Central Schools entered the Partnership and has a local light bulb collector that gets old fluorescent tubes .

Football 
The Barellan Rams compete in the Group 17 Rugby League competition. They were Clayton Cup winners as the best local team in the state in 1999 and 2002. 

The Barellan "Kangaroos" competed in the Central Riverina Football League from 1973 to 1981, then joined the Riverina Football League in 1982, but were relegated to the Riverina District Football League in 1983, after finishing on the bottom.

In 1984, the Riverina District Football League changed its name back to the Farrer Football League and Barellan competed in this league from 1984 to 1992, when they joined the Northern Riverina Football League in 1993 and had a great run of success with senior football premierships in - 1994, 95, 96, 97, 98 and 2011.

The Barellan "Two Blues" re-joined the Farrer Football League in 2015.

Gallery

References

External links

Barellan Public School
Barellan Railway Siding

Towns in the Riverina
Towns in New South Wales
Narrandera Shire